Hasteulia romulca is a species of moth of the family Tortricidae. It is found in Carchi Province, Ecuador.

References

Moths described in 1999
Euliini
Moths of South America
Taxa named by Józef Razowski